Microcline  (KAlSi3O8) is an important igneous rock-forming tectosilicate mineral. It is a potassium-rich alkali feldspar. Microcline typically contains minor amounts of sodium. It is common in granite and pegmatites. Microcline forms during slow cooling of orthoclase; it is more stable at lower temperatures than orthoclase. Sanidine is a polymorph of alkali feldspar stable at yet higher temperature. Microcline may be clear, white, pale-yellow, brick-red, or green; it is generally characterized by cross-hatch twinning that forms as a result of the transformation of monoclinic orthoclase into triclinic microcline.

The chemical compound name is potassium aluminium silicate, and it is known as E number reference E555.

Geology

Microcline may be chemically the same as monoclinic orthoclase, but because it belongs to the triclinic crystal system, the prism angle is slightly less than right angles; hence the name "microcline" from the Greek "small slope." It is a fully ordered triclinic modification of potassium feldspar and is dimorphous with orthoclase. Microcline is identical to orthoclase in many physical properties, and can be distinguished by x-ray or optical examination. When viewed under a polarizing microscope, microcline exhibits a minute multiple twinning which forms a grating-like structure that is unmistakable.

Perthite is either microcline or orthoclase with thin lamellae of exsolved albite.

Amazon stone, or amazonite, is a green variety of microcline. It is not found anywhere in the Amazon Basin, however. The Spanish explorers who named it apparently confused it with another green mineral from that region.

The largest documented single crystals of microcline were found in Devils Hole Beryl Mine, Colorado, US and measured ~50x36x14 m. This could be one of the largest crystals of any material found so far.

Microcline is commonly used for the manufacturing of porcelain.

As food additive
The chemical compound name is potassium aluminium silicate, and it is known as E number reference E555. It was the subject in 2018 of a Call for technical and toxicological data from the EFSA.

In 2008, it (along with other Aluminum compounds) was the subject of 
a Scientific Opinion of the Panel on Food Additives, Flavourings, Processing Aids and Food Contact Materials from the EFSA.

See also
List of minerals

References

Alkali feldspars U. Texas
Mindat

Potassium minerals
Aluminium minerals
Tectosilicates
Triclinic minerals
Feldspar
Luminescent minerals
E-number additives
Minerals in space group 2